The S&W Ladysmith (later styled LadySmith) is a series of handguns manufactured by Smith & Wesson starting early in the first decade of the 20th century. Early models, branded were chambered in .22 Long. Starting in the 1980s, under the slightly modified "LadySmith" moniker, S&W manufactured several short-barreled revolvers and semi-automatic pistols.

History
Smith & Wesson has produced firearms over the years in several standard frame sizes. M-frame refers to the small early Ladysmith frame. Later LadySmith small revolvers were made on the somewhat larger J-frame, the standard S&W small-frame revolver.

The tiny M-frame .22" hand-ejector Ladysmith revolver was produced from 1902 through 1921, and later diminutive revolvers were termed LadySmith, capitalizing the "S".

Models
 
 Smith & Wesson Model 36 LadySmith (AKA: Chief's Special LadySmith): a blued steel, small frame, 5-shot, .38 Special revolver.
 Smith & Wesson Model 60 LadySmith (AKA: Chief's Special LadySmith): a stainless steel, small frame, 5-shot, .38 Special or .357 Magnum, revolver.  
  Smith & Wesson Model 65 LadySmith: a stainless steel, medium frame, 6-shot, .357 Magnum revolver.
  Smith & Wesson  Model 631 LadySmith: a stainless steel, small frame, 6-shot, .32 H&R Magnum revolver.
 Smith & Wesson Model 642 LadySmith: a small frame, 5-shot, .38 Special, hammerless revolver with an aluminum frame and stainless steel cylinder.

Miscellaneous

Notes

References

External links
Smith & Wesson homepage

.38 Special firearms
Revolvers
Smith & Wesson revolvers
.357 Magnum firearms
9mm Parabellum revolvers
Police weapons